Primula pinnata is a species of flowering plant in the family Primulaceae, native to Irkutsk Oblast in Russia. It is a narrow endemic restricted to the Lake Baikal area.

References

pinnata
Endemic flora of Russia
Flora of Irkutsk Oblast
Plants described in 1952